Qoro is a Fijian surname. Notable people with the surname include:

 Gabrieli Qoro (born 1970), Fijian athlete
 Manasa Qoro (1964–2019), Fijian rugby union player
 Mor Yulios Elias Qoro (1881–1962), Turkish bishop
 Sivia Qoro, Fijian politician

Fijian-language surnames